A man–machine language (MML) is a specification language.  MML typically are defined to standardize the interfaces for managing a telecommunications or network device from a console.

ITU-T Z.300 series recommendations define an MML, that has been extended by Telcordia Technologies (formerly Bellcore) to form Transaction Language 1.

Further reading 

 

Specification languages
ITU-T recommendations